Edward Barkham may refer to:

Sir Edward Barkham (Lord Mayor) (died 1634), Lord Mayor of London 1621–1622
Sir Edward Barkham, 1st Baronet, of South Acre (c. 1595–1667), MP, son of the above
Sir Edward Barkham, 2nd Baronet, of South Acre (1628–1688), son of the above, of the Barkham baronets
Sir Edward Barkham, 1st Baronet, of Wainflete (1631–1669), Sheriff of Lincolnshire, grandson of Sir Edward Barkham (died 1634)
Sir Edward Barkham, 3rd Baronet, of Wainflete (c. 1680–1711), grandson of the above, of the Barkham baronets

See also
Barkham (surname)